Rameshbhai Chhotubhai Patel (popularly known as R. C. Patel) is an Indian politician, social worker and incumbent Member of legislative assembly for Jalalpore Assembly constituency in Gujarat. Patel is seating MLA from Jalalpore since 1998 and won all five term elections continued and Patel belong to Koli caste of Gujarat.

References 

21st-century Indian politicians
Gujarat MLAs 1998–2002
Gujarat MLAs 2002–2007
Gujarat MLAs 2007–2012
Gujarat MLAs 2017–2022
1959 births
Living people
People from Navsari district
Bharatiya Janata Party politicians from Gujarat